is a railway station in the city of Nagaoka, Niigata, Japan, operated by East Japan Railway Company (JR East).

Lines
Echigo-Takiya Station is served by the  Jōetsu Line and Iiyama Line.

Station layout
The station consists of two opposed ground-level side platforms  serving two tracks. The platforms are connected by a footbridge. The station is unattended.

Platforms

History
It was renamed to its present name on 1 October 1925. With the privatization of Japanese National Railways (JNR) on 1 April 1987, the station came under the control of JR East.

Surrounding area
Konan Middle School

See also
 List of railway stations in Japan

External links

 Echigo-Takiya Station (JR East) 

Railway stations in Nagaoka, Niigata
Railway stations in Japan opened in 1920
Stations of East Japan Railway Company
Jōetsu Line